Horace Lecoq de Boisbaudran (May 14, 1802 – August 7, 1897) was a French artist and  teacher.

He was born in Paris. Boisbaudran was admitted in 1819 to the École des Beaux-Arts where he studied under Peyron and Guillon Lethière. He exhibited at the Salon in 1831 and 1840, and became a professor at the academy.

As a drawing instructor he became known for his innovative method which emphasized memorization. His students were instructed to visit the Louvre, where they were to carefully study a painting in order to reproduce it from memory later, in the studio. This exercise was intended to help the student to discover his own visual language.

Among Lecoq de Boisbaudran's best-known students were Rodin, Fantin-Latour, and Alphonse Legros. Others who studied with him include Jules Chéret, Léon Lhermitte, Jean-Charles Cazin, Jules Dalou and Oscar Roty.
Lecoq de Boisbaudran died in Paris on August 7, 1897.

Books by Lecoq de Boisbaudran 
 Éducation de la mémoire pittoresque, Paris, 1848.
 Éducation de la mémoire pittoresque, application aux arts du dessin, 2e éd. augmentée, Paris, Bance, 1862.
 Lettres à un jeune professeur, Paris, Morel, 1876.
 Un Coup d'œil à l'enseignement aux Beaux-Arts, Paris, Morel, 1879.
 L'Éducation de la mémoire pittoresque et la formation de l'artiste, publié par Lowes Dalbiac Luard, Paris, Laurens, 1920 (compilation of the preceding titles).
The Training of the Memory in Art, and the Education of the  Artist (English translation of preceding titles, London, Macmillan, 1911)

Notes

References
McConkey, Kenneth, and Anna Gruetzner Robin. 1995. Impressionism in Britain. Yale University Press. .
State University of New York at Binghamton. 1974. Strictly academic : life drawing in the nineteenth century : a loan exhibition organized by the University Art Gallery, State University of New York at Binghamton. Binghamton: The Gallery.

1802 births
1897 deaths
French artists